Gortahurk may refer to:
 Gortahurk, Kilcronaghan civil parish, County Londonderry, Northern Ireland
 Gortahurk, Tomregan civil parish, County Fermanagh, Northern Ireland